Pseudoxymyia is a genus of flies in the family Stratiomyidae.

Species
Pseudoxymyia flavitarsis Lindner, 1959

References

Stratiomyidae
Brachycera genera
Taxa named by Erwin Lindner
Diptera of Africa